Laurence Nevins (2 July 1920 – June 1972) was an English professional footballer who played as an outside left in the Football League for Brighton & Hove Albion and Hartlepools United. He joined Newcastle United in 1939 as an amateur, and turned professional in 1940, but never made a peacetime appearance. During the Second World War, he made guest appearances for Middlesbrough and Queens Park Rangers, and played regularly for Dundee United in the Scottish wartime competitions while serving in the Royal Navy as a submariner.

References

1920 births
1972 deaths
Footballers from Gateshead
English footballers
Association football outside forwards
Newcastle United F.C. players
Brighton & Hove Albion F.C. players
Hartlepool United F.C. players
English Football League players
Dundee United F.C. wartime guest players
Middlesbrough F.C. wartime guest players
Queens Park Rangers F.C. wartime guest players
Royal Navy personnel of World War II
Royal Navy submariners